Nausherwan-E-Adil also called Farz Aur Mohabbat, is a 1957 Indian costume action drama Hindi/Urdu film directed by Sohrab Modi. Produced by Minerva Movietone, it had music composed by C. Ramchandra with lyrics by Parwaiz Shamshi. The story, screenplay and dialogue writer was Shams Lucknowi. The cinematographer was Lateef Bhandare. The cast included Sohrab Modi, Raaj Kumar, Mala Sinha, Naseem Banu, Bipin Gupta and Shammi.

The story is about an unbiased ruler, Nausherwan-E-Adil (Sohrab Modi), whose fair sense of justice brings about tragedy in his personal life involving his wife and son. The theme had some resemblance to Modi's earlier success Pukar (1939).

Plot
Sultan-e-Iran (Emperor of Iran) is a just ruler and known as such, Nausherwane-e-Adil (Nausherwan The Just) (Sohrab Modi). His laws are equal for everyone and he follows them in his dispensation of justice. However, when questioned about a certain ruling, by a Christian priest David (Bipin Gupta), he realises that the laws he is following have come down through ages without being written down. He decides to rectify this and gets his Wazir (Niranjan Sharma) to start work on it. Nausherwan now decides to go incognito into his country to see for himself whether his people are contented and happy. When he returns, he sets about bringing reformation into the laws with the help of his judiciary. He puts forth two laws; anyone deceiving a girl will be walled up, and anyone betraying the state will be put to death.

Nausherwan has a wife (Naseem Banu) and two sons, Naushahzad (Raaj Kumar) and Hormuz. He now declares his older son Naushahzad as heir to the throne. Naushahzad saves a young girl when he fishes her out of the water with the help of his friend, Altaf (Agha). They take her to the priest David where it's discovered that she's his long-separated daughter, Marcia (Mala Sinha). Naushazad says he's a Christian named Joseph. Soon, Marcia and Joseph (Naushahzad) fall in love. Joseph now declares to his mother (who's also a Christian) that he's a Christian, but she asks him to keep it hidden from his father as only an Iranian (Zoroastrian) can become the ruler. Complications arise and Nausherwan is tested when David and Marcia come to him demanding justice as they feel Naushahzad, as Joseph, has deceived them. When Nausherwan pronounces judgement as set down by his laws, Naushahzad revolts and is fought off by the Commander (Murad), who wounds him critically. Marcia kills herself with a dagger. Nausherwan now renounces his kingdom and establishes his younger son Hormuz as the new ruler.

Cast
 Sohrab Modi as Sultan-E-Iran Nausherwan-E-Adil
 Raaj Kumar as Shehzada Naushazad / Joseph
 Mala Sinha as Marcia
 Naseem Banu as Malika-E-Iran
 Bipin Gupta as Hakim David
 Murad as Ram Wazir
 Agha as Altaf
 Shammi as Altaf's Wife
 Niranjan Sharma as Wazir-E-Ala

Soundtrack
The film had music direction by C. Ramchandra and the lyricist was the poet Parvaiz Shamsi. The playback singers were Lata Mangeshkar, Mohammed Rafi, Asha Bhosle, Zohrabai Ambalewali and Chandbala. The film had some popular songs including the ghazal written by Parvaiz Shamsi; "Yeh Hasrat Thi Ki Is Duniya Mein Bas Do Kaam Kar Jaate", sung by Mohammed Rafi for Raaj Kumar.

Song list

Trivia
Raaj Kumar was unable to make his mark following this film, even though he was cast as a hero opposite Mala Sinha.

Further reading

References

External links

Songs Muvyz, Inc.

1957 films
1950s Hindi-language films
Films directed by Sohrab Modi
Films scored by C. Ramchandra
Indian epic films
Films set in Iran
Indian films based on actual events
Hindi-language films based on actual events
Indian historical musical films
Indian historical romance films
Khosrow I